William Arthur Johnson (born January 27, 1952), better known as Billy "White Shoes" Johnson, is an American former professional football player who was a wide receiver and return specialist in the National Football League (NFL) from 1974 through 1988.  A 75th and 100th Anniversary All-Time NFL Team selection, Johnson is also well known as one of the first players to display elaborate celebrations in the end zone.

Early life
Johnson earned his famous nickname as a high schooler at Chichester School District in Boothwyn, Pennsylvania, where he dyed his shoes as part of a dare.  Ever since then, he has been referred to by his nickname.  He was a very fast athlete, but his 5'9" size turned off prominent universities from recruiting him.  Billy ended up going to Widener College in Pennsylvania, a small Division III school, where he was a member of Alpha Sigma Phi fraternity.  While there, he had a highly successful career and was selected by the Associated Press as the first-team running back on the 1972 Little All-America college football team.  He was eventually discovered by the Houston Oilers, who drafted him in the 15th round of the 1974 NFL Draft.

Professional career

Houston Oilers
Johnson made the squad as a kickoff returner, with his speed and quickness becoming an occasional part of the offense. As a rookie, he began celebrating touchdowns with a dance known as the "Funky Chicken", a dance based on a song from soul singer Rufus Thomas. It was one of the first touchdown celebrations in league history. The dances, along with his footwear, made Johnson popular among Oilers fans.

As a kick returner, Johnson returned five punts for touchdowns, along with two kickoffs, in his first four years with the Oilers, and added 12 more touchdowns on offense. He was selected to the Pro Bowl as a kick returner in 1975, and was named MVP of the game, during which he returned a punt 90 yards for a touchdown. He made another Pro Bowl appearance in 1977. In 1979, he suffered a knee injury that caused him to miss most of the next two seasons and lingered with him for the rest of his career. When he returned in 1980, he was no longer the kick returner, serving only as a backup wide receiver.

CFL and the Atlanta Falcons
Johnson played the 1981 season in the Canadian Football League with the Montreal Alouettes, where he was a star on a team that went 3-13; he caught 65 passes for 1,060 yards and 5 touchdowns, and returned 59 punts for 597 yards (fellow NFL players Tom Cousineau, Vince Ferragamo, Keith Gary, James Scott, David Overstreet and future professional wrestler Lex Luger were teammates). He returned to the NFL with the Atlanta Falcons in 1982. In 1983, he doubled as a full-time kick returner, where he scored his sixth career touchdown on a punt return, and starting wide receiver, leading the team in receptions. Johnson earned his third Pro Bowl berth that season but his most memorable moment came on November 20 when he caught a deflected Hail Mary pass and weaved his way to the end zone to give the Falcons a last-second victory over the San Francisco 49ers. He missed most of 1984 due to injury, and was benched as a return man in 1985. He was also forced to curtail his end zone dances after the NFL instituted a rule against "excessive and premeditated celebration". However, he led the Falcons in receptions and receiving yards that season. Another injury in 1986 was the beginning of the end for Johnson, and he retired after the 1987 season, although he briefly un-retired to play one game for the Washington Redskins in 1988.

Coaching career
Johnson is currently an assistant varsity football coach at Duluth High School in Duluth, Georgia.

Professional softball career
Johnson appeared in 25 games for the Philadelphia Athletics of the American Professional Slo-Pitch Softball League (APSPL) in 1978, one of several men's professional softball leagues, batting .349 with 4 home-runs.

Honors
In 1994, Johnson was selected as the punt returner on the NFL 75th Anniversary All-Time Team. His days at Widener have also earned him a selection into the College Football Hall of Fame in 1996. He was inducted into the Philadelphia Sports Hall of Fame in 2018.

25 years after the 75th Anniversary all-Time team selection, Johnson was again selected as the punt returner on the All-Time Team for the 100th Anniversary and is still not in the Pro Football Hall of Fame.

Johnson is one of 29 individuals to be selected to multiple All-Decade teams.

Masters Track and Field
Johnson was also a star sprinter, and competed in Masters Track and Field after his football career.

References

External links

 Career stats

1952 births
Living people
African-American players of American football
African-American players of Canadian football
American Conference Pro Bowl players
American football wide receivers
American football return specialists
Atlanta Falcons players
Canadian football return specialists
Canadian football wide receivers
College Football Hall of Fame inductees
Houston Oilers players
Montreal Alouettes players
National Conference Pro Bowl players
People from Marcus Hook, Pennsylvania
Washington Redskins players
Widener Pride football players
Sportspeople from Delaware County, Pennsylvania
Players of American football from Pennsylvania
21st-century African-American people
20th-century African-American sportspeople
Ed Block Courage Award recipients